Ryan Pabillo Sermona (born October 31, 1987) is a Filipino boxer. He is a former WBC International Super Featherweight champion.

Professional career 
On December 6, 2013, Sermona won the WBC International Super Featherweight title by defeating Matt Garlett by fourth-round knockout.

On August 16, 2014, Sermona defended the WBC International Super Featherweight title against Corey McConnell, but lost by seventh-round technical knockout.

Professional boxing record 

| style="text-align:center;" colspan="8"|17 Wins (10 knockouts, 7 decisions),  7 Losses, 0 Draws
|-  style="text-align:center; background:#e3e3e3;"
|  style="border-style:none none solid solid; "|Res.
|  style="border-style:none none solid solid; "|Record
|  style="border-style:none none solid solid; "|Opponent
|  style="border-style:none none solid solid; "|Type
|  style="border-style:none none solid solid; "|Round, Time
|  style="border-style:none none solid solid; "|Date
|  style="border-style:none none solid solid; "|Location
|  style="border-style:none none solid solid; "|Notes
|- align=center
|Win
|17–7
|align=left| Gilbert Donasales
|
|
|
|align=left|
|align=left|
|- align=center
|Loss
|16–7
|align=left| Masayuki Ito
|
|
|
|align=left|
|align=left|
|- align=center
|Loss
|16–6
|align=left| Corey McConnell
|
|
|
|align=left|
|align=left|
|- align=center
|Loss
|align=center|16–5||align=left| Shingo Eto
|
|
|
|align=left|
|align=left|
|- align=center
|Win
|align=center|16–4||align=left| Matt Garlett
|
|
|
|align=left|
|align=left|
|- align=center
|Win
|align=center|15–4||align=left| Balweg Bangoyan
|
|
|
|align=left|
|align=left|
|- align=center
|Loss
|align=center|14–4||align=left| Viorel Simion
|
|
|
|align=left|
|align=left|
|- align=center
|Win
|align=center|14–3||align=left| Joan de Guia
|
|
|
|align=left|
|align=left|
|- align=center
|Win
|align=center|13–3||align=left| Roberto Gonzales
|
|
|
|align=left|
|align=left|
|- align=center
|Win
|align=center|12–3||align=left| Ratchata Twinswingym
|
|
|
|align=left|
|align=left|
|- align=center
|Win
|align=center|11–3||align=left| Vic Racuma
|
|
|
|align=left|
|align=left|
|- align=center
|Loss
|align=center|10–3||align=left| Nam-Joon Lee
|
|
|
|align=left|
|align=left|
|- align=center
|Win
|align=center|10–2||align=left| Dave Day Galas
|
|
|
|align=left|
|align=left|
|- align=center
|Win
|align=center|9–2||align=left| Rolando Omela
|
|
|
|align=left|
|align=left|
|- align=center
|Win
|align=center|8–2||align=left| Reggie Binueza
|
|
|
|align=left|
|align=left|
|- align=center
|Win
|align=center|7–2||align=left| Jomar Labiogo
|
|
|
|align=left|
|align=left|
|- align=center
|Win
|align=center|6–2||align=left| Mervin Batolina
|
|
|
|align=left|
|align=left|
|- align=center
|Loss
|align=center|5–2||align=left| Ronnel Esparas
|
|
|
|align=left|
|align=left|
|- align=center
|Win
|align=center|5–1||align=left| Ruel Cuizon
|
|
|
|align=left|
|align=left|
|- align=center
|Loss
|align=center|4–1||align=left| Jose Ocampo
|
|
|
|align=left|
|align=left|
|- align=center
|Win
|align=center|4–0||align=left| Jeffrey Torio
|
|
|
|align=left|
|align=left|
|- align=center
|Win
|align=center|3–0||align=left| Jeffrey Torio
|
|
|
|align=left|
|align=left|
|- align=center
|Win
|align=center|2–0||align=left| Jeffrey Torio
|
|
|
|align=left|
|align=left|
|- align=center
|Win
|align=center|1–0||align=left| Michael Dan
|
|
|
|align=left|
|align=left|

References 

1987 births
Living people
Featherweight boxers
Super-featherweight boxers
Filipino male boxers
Boxers from Negros Occidental